Phlox adsurgens, the northern phlox, is a species of flowering plant in the family Polemoniaceae. It is native to the US, in Oregon and a section of the northern Coast Ranges of California, where it belongs to the flora in forested and wooded mountain habitat. The inflorescence is a cluster of five-lobed pink flowers.

The Latin specific epithet adsurgens means "rising upwards".

References

External links

The Jepson eFlora 2013
CalPhotos

adsurgens
Flora of California
Flora of Oregon